A railway bridge is a bridge designed to carry trains.

Railway bridge may also refer to:
 Railway Bridge, Kaunas, crossing the Nemunas River in Lithuania
 Railway Bridge, Riga, crossing the Daugava river in Riga, Latvia
 New Railway Bridge, crossing the Sava river in Belgrade, Serbia
 Old Railway Bridge, crossing the Sava river in Belgrade, Serbia

See also 
 List of railway bridges and viaducts
 International Railroad Bridge (disambiguation)
 Railway viaduct